Iwiński (feminine: Iwińska, plural: Iwińscy) is a surname of Polish origin. It may refer to:

 Adam Iwiński (1958–2010), Polish director and cinematographer
 Andrzej Iwiński (1946–2020), Polish sailor
 Katarzyna Iwińska-Tomicka (1517–1551), Polish noblewoman
 Kazimierz Iwiński, Polish educator
 Marcin Iwiński, Polish billionaire
 Tadeusz Iwiński (born 1944), Polish politician

See also
 

Polish-language surnames